Pratt is an unincorporated community in Steele County, Minnesota, United States.

Geography
The community is located southeast of Owatonna along U.S. Highway 218 near Steele County Road 6, Austin Road.  Pratt is located within Aurora Township and Havana Township.  SE 48th Street is also in the immediate area.  Turtle Creek flows nearby. Nearby places include Owatonna, Owatonna Township, Somerset Township, and Bixby.

History
A post office called Pratt was established in 1879, and remained in operation until 1955. The community was named for William A. Pratt, an early settler.

References

Unincorporated communities in Steele County, Minnesota
Unincorporated communities in Minnesota